Jalamb is a town in Shegaon tehsil of Buldhana district, Maharashtra.

Transport
There is railway junction namely Jalamb Junction and is located between Nandura and Shegaon on Bhusawal–Badnera section of Bhusawal division of Central Railway. Jalamb connects Khamgaon town with main rail line through Jalamb Khamgaon RailBus.

Politics
Jalamb had been one of seven seats from Buldhana district in the Maharashtra State legislative assembly comprising parts of Shegaon, Nandura, Jalgaon Jamod and Sangrampur tehsil of Buldhana district. It is now a part of newly formed Jalgaon Jamod Vidhan Sabha constituency.

Description 

The town post office Postal Index Number (PIN code) is 444308.

Nearby villages are Matargaon, Belura, Pahurjira, and Alasna.

Nearby towns are Nandura on West, Shegaon on East.  The population of Jalamb is near about 8,000.
There is a Temple of Shani Maharaj In Between Jalamb and Kherda.

Train list

The following trains halts at Jalamb Junction.

.

References

Villages in Buldhana district